Daniel Vidart (October 7, 1920 in Paysandú – May 14, 2019) was a Uruguayan anthropologist, writer, historian, and essayist.

He was one of the most notable social scientists of the region. In 2010 he was awarded the Grand National Prize for Intellectual Activity.

He died in 2019, aged 98.

Works
 Tomás Berreta. La Industrial, Montevideo, 1946
 Esquema de una Sociología Rural Uruguaya. Ministerio de Ganadería y Agricultura, Montevideo, 1948
 Sociología Rural. Salvat, Barcelona, 2 vol. 1960
 Teoría del tango. Banda Oriental, Montevideo, 1964
 Los pueblos prehistóricos del territorio uruguayo. Centro Paul Rivet, Montevideo, 1965
 Caballos y jinetes. Pequeña historia de los pueblos ecuestres. Arca, Montevideo, 1967;
 El paisaje uruguayo. El medio biofísico y la respuesta  cultural  de  su habitante. Alfa, Montevideo, 1967
 El tango y su mundo. Tauro, Montevideo, 1967
 Ideología y realidad de América. Universidad de la República, Montevideo, 1968
 El legado de los inmigrantes (with Renzo Pi Hugarte), Nuestra Tierra, Montevideo, 1969-1970
 Los muertos y sus sombras. Cinco siglos de América. Banda Oriental, Montevideo, 1993
 El juego y la condición humana. Banda Oriental, Montevideo, 1995
 El mundo de los charrúas. Banda Oriental, Montevideo, 1996
 Los cerritos de los indios del Este uruguayo. Banda Oriental, Montevideo, 1996
 La trama de la identidad nacional, Banda Oriental, Montevideo:
Tº lº Indios, negros, gauchos, 1997
Tº 2º El diálogo ciudad – campo, 1998
Tº 3º El espíritu criollo, 2000
 Un vuelo chamánico. Editorial Fin de Siglo, Montevideo, 1999;
 El rico patrimonio de los orientales. Banda Oriental, Montevideo, 2003
 Cuerpo vestido, cuerpo desvestido. Antropología de la ropa interior femenina. (with Anabella Loy). Banda Oriental, Montevideo, 2000
 Los fugitivos de la historia. Banda Oriental,  Montevideo, 2009
 Tiempo de Navidad. Una antropología de la fiesta. (with Anabella Loy). Banda Oriental, Montevideo, 2009.
 Uruguayos. 2012
 Tiempo de carnaval. 2013

References

External links
 CV of Daniel Vidart

1920 births
2019 deaths
People from Paysandú Department
University of the Republic (Uruguay) alumni
National University of Colombia alumni
Uruguayan anthropologists
Uruguayan essayists
20th-century Uruguayan historians
Uruguayan non-fiction writers
Academic staff of the University of the Republic (Uruguay)
Academic staff of the National University of Colombia
Members of the Uruguayan Academy of Language
Royal Galician Academy
Recipients of the Delmira Agustini Medal
21st-century Uruguayan historians
Premio Bartolomé Hidalgo